John Young (September 1, 1773 – October 6, 1837) was a Scottish-born merchant, author, agronomist, and agricultural reformer in Nova Scotia. He represented Sydney County in the Nova Scotia House of Assembly from 1824 to 1837.  He supported the Royal Acadian School.

He was born in Falkirk, the son of William Young, and studied theology at University of Glasgow but did not graduate. He entered business at Falkirk and then Glasgow. Young married Agnes Renny. In 1814, he came to Halifax with his wife and sons and set up in business as a dry goods merchant there. Believing that there was room for improvement in the state of agriculture in the province, Young wrote a number of letters to the Acadian Recorder under the name Agricola. This led to the creation of a provincial agricultural society in 1818. From this society a Central Board of Agriculture was formed in 1819, Young became secretary and treasurer. Young ran unsuccessfully for the Halifax Township seat in the provincial assembly in 1823 before being elected for Sydney County in an 1824 by-election. He died in office in Halifax at the age of 64.

His sons William and George also served in the Nova Scotia assembly and his son Charles was colonial administrator for Prince Edward Island.

Nova Scotian artist William Valentine painted Young's portrait.

Letters of Agricola 

John Young, under the pseudonym of Agricola, wrote 38 letters in the Acadian Recorder from 1818 to 1819. These letters, would prove to be the basis of establishment and communication with a number of different agricultural societies throughout the province, as well as provide the basis for the subsequent development of the Central Board of Agriculture in 1819 and Young's appointment to the Central Board of Agriculture following Young revealing his identity to the public in 1819. Following this, Young would establish his own experimental farm before writing publicly under his own name again in 1821.

These letters, published as a group in 1822, are structured as such:

Climate
Soil
Agricultural Machinery
The Plough
The Harrow
Manures
Correspondence
Sherbooke Agricultural Society
Provincial Agricultural Society
Natural Obstructions in the Soil
Prizes Awarded
Digby Agricultural Society

These letters are often recognized as one of the earliest basis for the agricultural sciences and devoted attention to agricultural improvement in Canada.

Legacy 
 Namesake of Agricola Street, Halifax, Nova Scotia
 Namesake of the Agricola Collections of the MacRae Library of the Dalhousie University Faculty of Agriculture

References 

1773 births
1837 deaths
Nova Scotia pre-Confederation MLAs
Persons of National Historic Significance (Canada)
Canadian agronomists
Canadian agrarianists